During the 1926–27 season Hibernian, a football club based in Edinburgh, finished ninth out of 20 clubs in the Scottish First Division.

Scottish First Division

Final League table

Scottish Cup

See also
List of Hibernian F.C. seasons

References

External links
Hibernian 1926/1927 results and fixtures, Soccerbase

Hibernian F.C. seasons
Hibernian